Auguste (or Augusta) was a French 14-gun privateer commissioned in Saint-Malo in November 1811 under Pierre Jean Marie Lepeltier (or Pelletier). She captured numerous British merchant vessels before the Royal Navy forced her in January 1814 to run onshore and wreck.

Captures
Augusta, of Saint-Malo, and of 14 guns and 120 men, sailed from Saint-Malo on 29 November 1812 in the company of four other privateers. Cape Breton and Providence had been sailing from Cape Breton to Jersey. Mary had been sailing from Prince Edward Island to London, and Sparkler had been sailing from Cadiz to London. Mary was carrying a cargo of wood and Auguste gave her up; she arrived at Cork on 8 December. Cape Breton escaped. Auguste put the crews of the three other vessels aboard Mary, which arrived at Plymouth on 30 December.

In December Augusta captured three vessels: Catherine, Harmony, and Guardian. Catherine, Blyth, master, had been sailing from Suriname to London, and Harmony, Gallop, master, had been sailing from Newfoundland to Poole. Guardian, Musgrave, master, had also been sailing from Suriname to London.

Augusta had been out of Saint-Malo 16 days. Union, which had been sailing from Prince Edward Island, arrived at Liverpool.

On 24 December  recaptured Harmony, and the next day Catherine. The recaptured vessels arrived at Plymouth on 1 and 2 January 1813. On 5 January 1813 Lloyd's List reported that Foxhound had recaptured Harmony and Catherine, and that Favorite had recaptured Guardian and sent her into Plymouth.

On 15 February 1813, Auguste sighted a vessel in Cherbourg Roads to which she gave chase. This was Mary, "Hudges" (Hodges), master, which had been sailing from Jamaica to London. Mary was carrying sugar, coffee, rum, and other colonial produce, and Auguste brought her into Havre two days later. Lloyd's List reported that an (unnamed) French privateer had captured Mary. It further reported that the privateer had captured several other vessels, but that as a result of recent gales two had been lost between Barfleur and Cherbourg, and two had been driven on shore near Havre.

On 15 November Auguste, of Saint-Malo, and of 110 men and 14 guns, was off The Lizard when she captured Frederick, Storey, master. Frederick had been sailing from Seville and Lisbon to London; Auguste took her into Paimpol. Her cargo of wool sold for Fr.600,000.

On 18 November Auguste took into Saint-Malo and English brig of about 200 tons (bm). The brig had been sailing from Dublin with a cargo of linens and provisions. Augusta also took into Brehat an English vessel of 100 tons (bm) that was carrying a cargo of Segovia wool.
 
On 18 December Auguste was off The Lizard when she captured two vessels. Mary, Crow, master, had been sailing from Newfoundland to Dartmouth when captured, and Endeavour, Turner, master, had been sailing from Newfoundland to Teignmouth. Auguste sent Mary into Granville, Manche, and Endeavour into Brehat.

Also in December, Auguste captured James's, Clarke, master, which had been sailing from Malta to London. Auguste sent her into Brehat.

Around 20 December a vessel of 100 tons (bm), carrying a cargo of iron, came into Morlaix. She was a prize to Auguste. About the same time Auguste sent into Roscoff a Spanish vessel carrying St Ubes salt. she sent into Lannion an English vessel of 70–90 tons (bm), carrying fish and oil. Lastly, she sent into the same port a vessel of about 180 tons (bm), carrying oil, cream of tartar, and fruit.

Fate
Auguste was wrecked off Béniguet on 23 January 1814. British sources reported on 15 February 1814 that  had chased the schooner Auguste, of 120 men and 16 guns, on shore. Only the captain and 10 men were saved.

Notes, citations, and references
Notes

Citations

References
 
 
 

1811 ships
Privateer ships of France
Maritime incidents in 1814